This is a list of the largest cities of the Mexican state of Jalisco, based on the population of the cities, not including the municipalities' total population.

 01
Jalisco
Jalisco
Mexico-related lists of superlatives
Lists of cities by population